McCasland is a surname. Notable people with the surname include:

Cameron McCasland (born 1981), American film director
Grant McCasland, American basketball coach
Neil McCasland, retired United States Air Force Major General
Vernon McCasland, American football coach

See also
McCasland Field House, building at the University of Oklahoma, United States